Jerry Davarus Jeudy (born April 24, 1999) is an American football wide receiver for the Denver Broncos of the National Football League (NFL). He played college football at Alabama, where he was awarded the Fred Biletnikoff Award as the nation's best wide receiver as a sophomore in 2018, and was drafted by the Broncos with the 15th overall pick of the 2020 NFL Draft.

Early years
Jeudy attended Deerfield Beach High School in Deerfield Beach, Florida, where he played high school football. As a high school senior in 2016, he had 76 receptions for 1,054 yards and 15 touchdowns. Jeudy was rated as a five star recruit, the third highest rated wide receiver in the country and 21st highest rated recruit overall by the 247Sports Composite. He committed to the University of Alabama to play college football on July 28, 2016.

College career

Freshman year: 2017
Jeudy enrolled early at Alabama and participated in spring practice for the 2017 season. He was named the MVP of Alabama's A-Day spring game after catching five passes for 134 yards and two touchdowns. Jeudy caught his first career pass in Alabama's second game of the season against Fresno State. In total, Jeudy amassed 14 receptions for 264 yards and two touchdowns during his true freshman season.

Sophomore year: 2018
During the spring before his sophomore season in 2018, Jeudy underwent surgery for a meniscus injury which led him to miss part of spring practice. He fully recovered in time for fall camp, saying "I feel great, actually. I forgot I got injured to be real." Jeudy was named third-team preseason All-SEC at SEC Media Days.

Jeudy caught six touchdown passes in Alabama's first three games of the 2018 season, including a 136-yard, two-touchdown performance against Ole Miss. He had 135 yards and two touchdowns against Arkansas on October 6, and the next week set a career high with 147 yards and a touchdown against Missouri. He had 139 yards and a touchdown in Alabama's loss to Clemson in the 2019 College Football Playoff National Championship.

Jeudy was named a consensus first-team All-American and first-team All-SEC. He was awarded the Fred Biletnikoff Award as the nation's best wide receiver. His 14 receiving touchdowns led the conference and was tied for third nationally, and his 1,315 receiving yards were second in the conference behind Ole Miss's A. J. Brown.

Junior year: 2019

Jeudy was a unanimous pre-season All-American heading into his junior year, and a favorite to repeat as the Biletnikoff Award winner. Numerous publications named him among the best returning players in the country, and he was listed on several Heisman Trophy watchlists.

Jeudy was the Crimson Tide's leading receiver in each of their first two games, finishing with 137 yards and a touchdown in the season opener against Duke, and 103 yards and three touchdowns against New Mexico State the following week. Jeudy eclipsed 100 yards in only two more games during the regular season, in part due to the season-ending injury of quarterback Tua Tagovailoa.  He finished the regular season with 959 yards receiving and 9 touchdowns and was again named first-team All-SEC. He capped off his junior season with six receptions for 204 yards and a touchdown in the Crimson Tide's win over Michigan in the Citrus Bowl. In January 2020, Jeudy announced he would forgo his senior season by entering the 2020 NFL Draft.

College statistics

Professional career

Jeudy was drafted by the Denver Broncos with the 15th pick in the first round of the 2020 NFL Draft. He was the second wide receiver selected, behind Henry Ruggs (Las Vegas Raiders, 12th overall). On July 23, 2020, Jeudy signed a 4-year, $15.192 million contract with the team, with an $8.6 million signing bonus.

2020 season

On September 14, 2020, Jeudy made his NFL debut in the season opener against the Tennessee Titans, recording four receptions for 56 yards in the 14–16 loss. In Week 4, against the New York Jets on Thursday Night Football, Jeudy recorded his first professional touchdown reception a 48-yard on a pass from Brett Rypien. In Week 9, against the Atlanta Falcons, he had his first 100-yard game with seven receptions for 125 receiving yards during the 34–27 loss. In Week 16, Jeudy was credited with 5 drops in addition to 6 catches for 61 yards in a 16–19 loss to the Los Angeles Chargers. Jeudy finished the season with 9 total drops according to NBC Sports, tied for second most in the league with fellow rookie CeeDee Lamb, though PFF credits Jeudy with 12 drops on the season. His 44% catch rate was one of the lowest in the league among qualified receivers in 2020, ranking exactly 200th.

2021 season

Jeudy recorded six catches for 72 yards in Week 1 against the New York Giants before suffering a high ankle sprain that caused him to leave the game. He was placed on injured reserve on September 14, 2021. He was activated on October 30. Jeudy finished the season with 38 receptions for 467 yards and zero touchdowns. His 67.9% catch rate ranked 91st among qualified receivers.

2022 season

Jeudy had his best statistical season to date in 2022, in terms of yards, receptions, and TDs, despite sustaining an injury against the Tennessee Titans on November 13. He returned December 4. On December 16, Jeudy was fined $36,281 for unsportsmanlike conduct in Week 14 where he removed his helmet and made illegal contact with an official. In Week 17, Jeudy had a career-high 154 yards on five catches in a 31-28 win over the Chargers, earning AFC Offensive Player of the Week. Although his drops were down from previous seasons, Jeudy finished the season with a catch rate of just 67%, which was 101st in the league among qualified receivers.

NFL career statistics

Personal life
While Jeudy was a senior in high school in 2016, his seven-year-old sister Aaliyah died. In Jeudy's senior year of high school, he earned straight A's.

Jeudy is of Haitian descent.

Jeudy wears a Jewish Star of David necklace, even though he is not Jewish. His reason is that due to his surname being "Jeudy," people sometimes call him simply the first syllable -- "Jew"; so he got the necklace.

Legal troubles
On May 12, 2022, Jeudy was arrested in Arapahoe County, Colorado and charged with second-degree criminal tampering with a domestic violence enhancer, a misdemeanor. The arrest stemmed from an alleged non-violent incident with his girlfriend, who has since asked that the charges be dropped.

References

External links

Denver Broncos bio
Alabama Crimson Tide bio

1999 births
Living people
Alabama Crimson Tide football players
All-American college football players
American football wide receivers
American sportspeople of Haitian descent
Jeudy, Jerry
Denver Broncos players
People from Deerfield Beach, Florida
Players of American football from Florida
Sportspeople from Broward County, Florida